Kumaka is a village in the East Berbice–Corentyne region of Guyana.  It stands on the right bank of the upper Essequibo River, about 35 km above Apoteri and the confluence of the Rupununi River with the Essequibo, at an elevation of 105 metres (344 ft).

References 
 Google Earth, version 4.0.2722 (2007-01-05)

Notes

External links 
 Map (Multimap.com)

Populated places in East Berbice-Corentyne